Addji Keaninkin Marc-Israel Guéhi (born 13 July 2000) is an English professional footballer who plays as a centre-back for  club Crystal Palace and the England national team.

Guéhi came through the youth system at Chelsea before spending two seasons on loan at Swansea City. He joined Crystal Palace in July 2021, becoming the club's third most expensive signing. He has represented England at youth level and was a regular starter in the 2017 FIFA U-17 World Cup winning squad.

Early life
Guéhi was born in Abidjan, Ivory Coast, and moved with his family to London, England, at one year of age. His father was a minister of a local church, meaning his childhood often focused on religion and education over football. He began playing in the Cray Wanderers youth system aged six and was coached by a scout from Premier League club Chelsea. After two years with the non-League club, he signed for Chelsea and progressed through the academy.

Club career

Chelsea
Progressing through the youth ranks, Guéhi regularly featured for the under-18s during their treble-winning campaign in 2017. In September 2017, he signed his first professional contract, for three years. The following season, he helped the under-18s win a quadruple and reach the final of the UEFA Youth League.  

On 12 May 2019, Guéhi was named in a Premier League squad for the first time as a substitute in a 0–0 draw away to Leicester City. He featured as an unused substitute a further three times during the 2019–20 season. On 17 September, he was an unused substitute in a 1–0 defeat to Valencia in the UEFA Champions League. The following week, he made his professional debut in a 7–1 win against Grimsby Town in the EFL Cup third round. His second and final appearance for the club came in a 2–1 defeat to Manchester United in the Fourth Round on 30 October.

Swansea City
On 10 January 2020, Guéhi joined Championship club Swansea City on loan for the remainder of the 2019–20 season. The move saw him re-unite with Steve Cooper, who had previously managed him in England's 2017 FIFA U-17 World Cup winning squad. After being named as an unused substitute on two occasions, Guéhi made his debut in a 2–0 defeat to Stoke City on 25 January. He remained in the starting XI for the next four games, but came under criticism after Swansea failed to win any of their last five games. Cooper backed the defender and stated "it's difficult for young players to make an instant impact".

Following a three-month pause due to the COVID-19 pandemic, Guéhi was named on the bench twice before returning as a late substitute in a 1–1 draw against Millwall. On 5 July, he made his first start in five months in a 2–1 win over Sheffield Wednesday. He started in all five of Swansea's remaining league matches and helped guide the team to sixth place and a play-off position. He featured in both legs of the semi-final as Swansea lost 3–2 on aggregate to Brentford.

On 26 August 2020, Guéhi returned to Swansea on loan for the 2020–21 season. He became an ever-present figure in defence with only four Swansea players appearing for more minutes throughout the campaign. Guéhi began the season with three consecutive clean sheets against Preston North End, Birmingham City and Wycombe Wanderers, and went on to keep a further 14 in the league as Swansea finished fourth. He played every minute of their play-off campaign, beating Barnsley 2–1 across the semi-finals before a 2–0 final defeat to Brentford.

Crystal Palace
On 18 July 2021, Guéhi joined Crystal Palace on a five-year contract for a reported fee of £18 million, making him the club's third-most expensive signing of all-time, behind Christian Benteke and Mamadou Sakho. It was also reported that Chelsea had included sell-on incentives and the right to match any offers made for Guéhi in future.

International career
Guéhi captained the England national under-17 team at the UEFA European Under-17 Championship in May 2017. He played in every match at the competition, scoring an own goal in the opening 3–1 win against Norway. England went on to lose on penalties to Spain in the final. In October 2017, he was included in the squad for the 2017 FIFA U-17 World Cup. On 28 October, he scored the fourth goal in a 5–2 victory against Spain as England were crowned world champions.

In October 2018, Guéhi progressed to the England under-19 team and scored in a friendly against Portugal. He also scored in 2019 Elite Qualifiers against the Czech Republic and Denmark. 

In August 2019, Guéhi was included in an England under-21 squad for the first time. On 6 September 2021, Lee Carsley confirmed Guéhi as captain of the under-21s.

Guéhi received his first call-up to the England senior team in March 2022 as part of Gareth Southgate's squad for friendly matches against Switzerland and Ivory Coast. He made his senior debut in a 2–1 win over Switzerland at Wembley Stadium on 26 March.

Career statistics

Club

International

Honours
England U17
FIFA U-17 World Cup: 2017
UEFA European Under-17 Championship runner-up: 2017

Individual
UEFA European Under-17 Championship Team of the Tournament: 2017

References

External links

Profile at the Crystal Palace F.C. website
Profile at the Football Association website

2000 births
Living people
Footballers from Abidjan
English footballers
Association football defenders
Cray Wanderers F.C. players
Chelsea F.C. players
Swansea City A.F.C. players
Crystal Palace F.C. players
English Football League players
Premier League players
England youth international footballers
England under-21 international footballers
England international footballers
Black British sportsmen
English people of Ivorian descent
Ivorian emigrants to the United Kingdom